Ashok Mitra (10 April 1928 – 1 May 2018) was an Indian economist and Marxist politician. He was a chief economic adviser to the Government of India and later became finance minister of West Bengal and a member of the Rajya Sabha.

Early life and education
After completing his graduation from the University of Dacca, he came to India following the partition of India in 1947. Although he attended postgraduate classes in economics at the University of Calcutta, he was refused admission there. He moved to Banaras Hindu University where he earned an M.A. in economics. He joined the newly established Delhi School of Economics in the early 1950s. Later, he attended the Institute of Social Studies in the Netherlands. Under the guidance of Professor Jan Tinbergen of the Erasmus University Rotterdam, he was awarded a doctorate in economics there in 1953.

Career

Academic
Mitra taught as a lecturer in economics at the University of Lucknow for two years before proceeding to the Netherlands to complete his PhD thesis. He taught at the UN Economic Commission for Asia and the Far East in Bangkok, Thailand, before returning to Delhi in 1961. He joined the Economic Development Institute in Washington, D.C., as a faculty of economics during the early 1960s. He also worked for the World Bank in the 1960s. In the early-1990s he became the chairman of the Centre for Studies in Social Sciences, Calcutta.

Political
After returning to India he accepted the professorship in economics at the newly established Indian Institute of Management Calcutta. He was the chief economic adviser and later chairman of the Agricultural Prices Commission, both of the Government of India. He was finance minister of West Bengal from 1977–87. In the mid-1990s he became a member of the Rajya Sabha and was chairman of the Parliament's Standing Committee on Industry and Commerce.

Scholarship
He authored the "Calcutta Diary" in Economic and Political Weekly and "Terms of Trade and Class Relations". He contributed articles regularly to the Calcutta-based national daily newspaper, The Telegraph. He also wrote short stories in Bengali. He was conferred the Sahitya Academi Award in 1996 for his Essays entitled Tal Betal. His publications include China-Issues in Development and From the Ramparts, Prattler's Tale: Recollections of a Contrary Marxist (which has also been published in Bengali as Apila Chapala).

He founded a journal entitled Arek Rakam.

Death and family
Mitra was married to Gouri, who died aged 79 in May 2008. He died on 1 May 2018 at the age of 90. Ashok Mitra is survived by his only sibling, Sreelata Ghosh (née Mitra), sister.

References

Further reading

1928 births
2018 deaths
Communist Party of India (Marxist) politicians from West Bengal
Marxian economists
20th-century Indian economists
Indian memoirists
Scientists from West Bengal
University of Dhaka alumni
Banaras Hindu University alumni
Academic staff of Delhi University
Academic staff of the University of Calcutta
Academic staff of the Indian Institute of Management Calcutta
Academic staff of the University of Lucknow
University of Calcutta alumni
Rajya Sabha members from West Bengal
Scholars from West Bengal
West Bengal MLAs 1977–1982
West Bengal MLAs 1982–1987
Chief Economic Advisers to the Government of India